Acmispon procumbens, synonym Lotus procumbens, is a species of legume endemic to California. It is known by the common name silky deerweed. It is known from many habitat types in several regions from the Central Valley to the Mojave Desert to the Peninsular Ranges.

Description
It is a tough, hairy perennial herb spreading as a clumpy mat or sometimes growing erect to approach a meter in height. Its slender branches are lined with small leaves each made up usually three leaflets. The inflorescence is generally 1 to 3 solid or red-veined yellow flowers between 1 and 2 centimeters long. The fruit is a legume pod just over a centimeter long containing 2 or 3 beanlike seeds.

References

External links
Jepson Manual Treatment
USDA Plants Profile
Photo gallery

procumbens
Endemic flora of California
Flora without expected TNC conservation status